Abana District is a district of the Kastamonu Province of Turkey. Its seat is the town of Abana. Its area is 28 km2, and its population is 4,027 (2021). Abana's coastline is 11 km long, of which 7 km is a natural sand beach, making the district a popular summer resort for the region.

Composition
There is one municipality in Abana District:
 Abana

There are 10 villages in Abana District:

 Akçam
 Altıkulaç
 Çampınar
 Denizbükü
 Elmaçukuru
 Göynükler
 Kadıyusuf
 Yakabaşı
 Yemeni
 Yeşilyuva

References

Districts of Kastamonu Province